

See also
Testicle